Pentadesma is a genus of flowering plants belonging to the family Clusiaceae.

Its native range is Western and Western Central Tropical Africa.

Species
Species:

Pentadesma butyracea 
Pentadesma exelliana 
Pentadesma grandifolia 
Pentadesma lebrunii 
Pentadesma reyndersii

References

Clusiaceae
Malpighiales genera